Joseph Kent Massey (born April 2, 1952 in Oklahoma City, Oklahoma) is an American competitive sailor and Olympic medalist. He won a bronze medal in the Soling class at the 1996 Summer Olympics in Atlanta, together with Jim Barton and Jeff Madrigali.

References

External links
 
 
 

1952 births
Living people
American male sailors (sport)
North American Champions Soling
Olympic bronze medalists for the United States in sailing
Sailors at the 1996 Summer Olympics – Soling
Medalists at the 1996 Summer Olympics